The United States Army Military Intelligence Readiness Command (MIRC, The MIRC, formally USAMIRC) was stood up as the first Army Reserve functional command in 2005. Headquartered at Fort Belvoir, Virginia, MIRC is composed mostly of reserve soldiers in units throughout the United States, and encompasses the bulk of Army Military Intelligence reserve units, consisting of over 40 strategic and tactical intelligence units throughout the United States. Specialized capabilities that MIRC provides include theater intelligence support, support to NSA and INSCOM, and strategic intelligence support to Combatant Commands and combat support agencies. MIRC is subordinate to United States Army Reserve Command. MIRC’s commanding general is Brigadier General Joseph F. Dziezynski, who departed the role of Deputy Commander of INSCOM, a position he had held since February 2019, to assume command. In his remarks at the change of command ceremony, Dziezynski was clear about the command's embrace of America’s shifting priorities from counterinsurgency in Southwest Asia to competition with China, saying “today, everything old is new again as our nation and our Army prepare to face new threats in this era of great power competition.”

Structure

Major military intelligence units

List of commanding generals

See also
 United States Army Intelligence and Security Command
Military Intelligence Corps
 United States Army Reserve
 United States Army Reserve Command
 Reserve Component of the Armed Forces of the United States

References

Commands of the United States Army
Military units and formations of the United States Army Reserve